Megion is a town in Khanty-Mansi Autonomous Okrug–Yugra, Russia, located at the altitude of  above sea level, on the right bank of the Ob River,  east of Khanty-Mansiysk and  northeast of Tyumen. Population:  46,566 (2002 Census); 

Foundation and further town development became possible with the discovery of petroleum on this site. It predetermined the construction of Megion and Nizhnevartovsk which both are now regarded as a major centre of oil producing.

History 
It was first mentioned in 1810. In 1961, the first oil in Western Siberia was struck there. On September 29, 1964, Megion was granted urban-type settlement status. On July 23, 1980, it was elevated in status to that of a town. Now the town is a center of the oil and natural gas industries.

Administrative and municipal status 
Within the framework of administrative divisions, it is, together with one urban-type settlement, incorporated as the town of okrug significance of Megion—an administrative unit with the status equal to that of the districts. As a municipal division, the town of okrug significance of Megion is incorporated as Megion Urban Okrug.

Gallery

References

Notes

Sources

External links 
Official website of Megion
Official website of Megion 

Cities and towns in Khanty-Mansi Autonomous Okrug
Populated places on the Ob River